The 1998 NBA draft took place on June 24, 1998, at General Motors Place in Vancouver, British Columbia, Canada. This draft helped turn around four struggling franchises: the Dallas Mavericks, the Sacramento Kings, the Boston Celtics, and the Toronto Raptors.

The Vancouver Grizzlies and the Toronto Raptors were not able to win the NBA draft lottery; as they were expansion teams, they were not allowed to select first in this draft.

The Mavericks, despite having a talented nucleus of Jason Kidd, Jamal Mashburn and Jimmy Jackson in the mid-1990s, had not had a winning season since 1989-90, which was also the last time they made the playoffs. By the end of the 1997 season, all three players were traded and it was time to rebuild. With the sixth selection in 1998, they drafted Robert Traylor and quickly traded him to the Milwaukee Bucks for Dirk Nowitzki and Pat Garrity. They then traded Garrity in a package to the Phoenix Suns for Steve Nash. With Nash and Nowitzki, the Mavericks quickly went from a lottery team in the late 1990s to a perennial playoff contender throughout the 2000s. Nowitzki went on to win the 2011 NBA Finals with Dallas without Nash, but with Kidd.

Meanwhile, the Raptors were a recent expansion team that had failed to win more than 30 games in its first three seasons. With the fourth pick they selected Antawn Jamison, whom they quickly dealt to the Golden State Warriors for Vince Carter. Carter went on to win Rookie of the Year.

First overall pick Michael Olowokandi from mid-major University of the Pacific is regarded by Sports Illustrated as one of the biggest draft busts in NBA history. As of February 2019, he is the last top selection to come out of a university that is considered mid-major.

Five players from the 1998 draft class played in the NBA All-Star Game at least once in their careers: Nowitzki, Carter, Jamison, Paul Pierce and Rashard Lewis. All of them except Lewis scored at least 20,000 career points.

Carter retired in 2020, making him the last active player drafted in the 1990s to retire. He set the record for most seasons played in the NBA with 22, becoming the first player to ever appear in NBA games in four different decades. Nowitzki missed the same four-decade status by nine months, retiring from the Mavericks in April 2019 as the first player to ever spend more than 20 NBA seasons with one team.

Draft selections

Notable undrafted players

These players eligible for the 1998 NBA Draft were not selected but played at least one game in the NBA.

Early entrants

College underclassmen
The following college basketball players successfully applied for early draft entrance.

  Rafer Alston – G, Fresno State (junior)
  Corey Benjamin – G, Oregon State (sophomore)
  Mike Bibby – G, Arizona (sophomore)
  Chandar Bingham – F, Virginia Union (sophomore)
  Marcus Bullard – G, Auburn Montgomery (junior)
  Vince Carter – F/G, North Carolina (junior)
  Wayne Clark – G, Park (freshman)
  Tim Cole – G, Northeast Mississippi CC (sophomore)
  Peter Cornell – C, Loyola Marymount (junior)
  Arthur Davis – G, St. Joseph's (sophomore)
  Ricky Davis – F/G, Iowa (freshman)
  Tremaine Fowlkes – F, Fresno State (junior)
  Larry Hughes – G, Saint Louis (freshman)
  Randell Jackson – F, Florida State (junior)
  Jerome James – C, Florida A&M (junior)
  Antawn Jamison – F, North Carolina (junior)
  Tyronn Lue – G, Nebraska (junior)
  Jelani McCoy – F/C, UCLA (junior)
  Mark Miller – G, UIC (junior)
  Nazr Mohammed – F/C, Kentucky (junior)
  Paul Pierce – G/F, Kansas (junior)
  Adam Roberts – G, San Francisco State (junior)
  James Spears – F, Shaw (junior)
  Robert Traylor – F, Michigan (junior)
  Winfred Walton – F, Fresno State (sophomore)
  Jason Williams – G, Florida (sophomore)

High school players
The following high school players successfully applied for early draft entrance.

  Al Harrington – F, St. Patrick (Elizabeth, New Jersey)
  Rashard Lewis – F, Alief Elsik HS (Houston, Texas)
  Ellis Richardson – G, Polytechnic (Los Angeles, California)
  Korleone Young – F, Hargrave Military Academy (Chatham, Virginia)

International players
The following international players successfully applied for early draft entrance.

  Slava Medvedenko – F, Budivelnyk (Ukraine)
  Dirk Nowitzki – F, DJK Würzburg (Germany)
  Bruno Šundov – C, Split (Croatia)

See also
 List of first overall NBA draft picks

References

External links
 
 1998 NBA Draft at Basketball-Reference.com

Draft
National Basketball Association draft
NBA draft
1990s in Vancouver
Basketball in Vancouver
Events in Vancouver